The Howard Years was a documentary series about the prime ministership of John Howard produced by the Australian Broadcasting Corporation. It was divided into four one-hour episodes - one episode for each term Howard served as Prime Minister of Australia - and originally broadcast on ABC1 from 17 November to 8 December 2008.

2000s Australian documentary television series